Àlex Corretja defeated Javier Frana 6–3, 5–7, 7–6(7–5) to win the 1994 ATP Buenos Aires singles competition. Carlos Costa was the defending champion.

Seeds

  Alberto Berasategui (quarterfinals)
  Carlos Costa (second round)
  Àlex Corretja (champion)
  Slava Doseděl (quarterfinals)
  Karel Nováček (semifinals)
  Gilbert Schaller (second round)
  Fabrice Santoro (first round)
  Francisco Clavet (semifinals)

Draw

Finals

Top half

Bottom half

External links
 1994 ATP Buenos Aires Singles draw

Singles
ATP
ATP Buenos Aires